This list of GP2 Series drivers includes drivers who have made at least one race start in the GP2 Series. This list does not include drivers who have only appeared in the sister GP2 Asia Series (see List of GP2 Asia Series drivers). This list is accurate up to and including the last round of the 2016 season (Abu Dhabi). It does not include data from the non-championship races held in 2011.

By name

By racing license

See also
List of GP2 Series driver records

Footnotes

References

 
Gp2 Series drivers